The 1993 Allan Cup was the Canadian senior ice hockey championship for the 1992–93 senior "AAA" season.  The event was hosted by the Quesnel Kangaroos in Quesnel, British Columbia.  The 1993 tournament marked the 85th time that the Allan Cup has been awarded.

The 1993 Allan Cup was an absolute rarity, as for the first time a team from the Yukon Territory won the Allan Cup.  Absent from the tournament were any teams from Eastern Canada.

Teams
Quesnel Kangaroos (Host)
Stony Plain Eagles
Warroad Lakers
Whitehorse Huskies

Results
Round Robin
Whitehorse Huskies 5 - Stony Plain Eagles 4
Warroad Lakers 9 - Quesnel Kangaroos 6
Stony Plain Eagles 6 - Warroad Lakers 5
Whitehorse Huskies 6 - Quesnel Kangaroos 2
Whitehorse Huskies 8 - Warroad Lakers 8
Quesnel Kangaroos 7 - Stony Plain Eagles 4
Semi-final
Quesnel Kangaroos 9 - Warroad Lakers 6
Final
Whitehorse Huskies 7 - Quesnel Kangaroos 4

External links
Allan Cup archives 
Allan Cup website

Allan Cup
Allan